Scum is a 1979 British drama film directed by Alan Clarke and starring Ray Winstone, Mick Ford, Julian Firth and John Blundell. The film portrays the brutality of life inside a British borstal. The script was originally filmed as a television play for the BBC's Play for Today series in 1977. However, due to the violence depicted, it was withdrawn from broadcast. Two years later, director Alan Clarke and scriptwriter Roy Minton remade it as a film, first shown on Channel 4 in 1983. By this time the borstal system had been reformed. The original TV version was eventually allowed to be aired eight years later in 1991.

The film tells the story of a young offender named Carlin as he arrives at the institution and his rise through violence and self-protection to the top of the inmates' pecking order, purely as a tool to survive. Beyond Carlin's individual storyline, the film also serves as an indictment of the borstal system's flaws with no attempt at rehabilitation. The warders and convicts alike are brutalised by the system. The film's controversy arose over its graphic depiction of racism, extreme violence, rape, suicide, many fights and very strong language.

Plot 
Three young men arrive at borstal by prison van: Carlin, who has taken the blame for his brother's theft of scrap metal; Angel for stealing a car and Davis for escaping from an open institution. Each is allocated a room; Angel and Davis get private rooms while Carlin is sent to a dormitory.

Carlin wants to keep a low profile, having been transferred for assaulting a warden. He meets and befriends Archer, an eccentric and intellectual inmate intent on peacefully inconveniencing the staff as much as possible, and is informed his reputation is already known; Banks, the current "Daddy" (the inmate who controls the wing) is seeking Carlin for a fight to maintain his dominance over the wing.

Carlin struggles to settle into the dormitory, and after having watched the timid and bullied Davis be attacked by Banks, is eventually viciously assaulted by Banks who repeatedly headbutts him in an unprovoked attack.

Carlin eventually gets his revenge on Banks, using a makeshift cosh from a long sock with two snooker balls inside to beat Richards, then confronts Banks in the bathroom and brutalises him. He then informs him that he is replacing him as the "Daddy" of the ward, and will 'kill him' if he ever interferes with his or his friends' business again. Carlin later takes over the adjacent wing of the borstal by viciously beating the adjacent wing's Daddy.

Life improves for the inmates under Carlin, with victimisation of younger, weaker prisoners prevented, along with racially-motivated violence. Carlin gains status with the wardens, persuading them to move him from the dormitory to a single cell in return for agreeing to be a responsible "natural leader". Mr Goodyear, the housemaster, offers Carlin a  leadership position in the borstal to help him develop his leadership skills.

Another inmate, Toyne, learns through a letter from his in-laws that his wife has died, and sinks into despair, eventually slashing his wrists. After being moved to another prison, word reaches the inmates that he has killed himself in a second suicide attempt. Davis, meanwhile, is framed for theft by Eckersley and placed on report. Carlin advises Davis to avoid them, though Davis is subsequently gang-raped by three youths in a greenhouse. This is seen by warder Sands, who merely smiles at the rape. Davis slips into despair, and kills himself when he uses a razor blade to slash himself in his cell at night. While bleeding to death, he presses the button in his cell for help, but is ignored by warder Greaves.

Davis's suicide causes mass hysteria within the prison, with the inmates refusing to eat their food at dinner. Carlin initiates a full-scale riot in the dinner hall. Carlin, Archer and Toyne's friend Meakin are shown being dragged, bleeding and unconscious, into solitary confinement after having been beaten by the wardens. The Borstal's Governor later informs them the damage to the dinner hall will be repaid through lost earnings. The Governor then declares a minute's silent prayer for Davis and Toyne.

Cast

Inmates

Borstal staff

Deviations from original BBC production 
The film differs from the original BBC production in many respects. The film contains strong language and is much more violent and graphic than the milder BBC version. Ray Winstone, John Blundell, Phil Daniels, John Judd, Ray Burdis and Patrick Murray all reprise their respective roles as Carlin, Banks, Richards, Sands, Eckersley and Dougan from the BBC version, while all other roles are recast. David Threlfall had been intended to reprise his role as Archer from the BBC version, but he was working with the Royal Shakespeare Company at the time and was subsequently replaced by Mick Ford. The story was also changed. The BBC version features a homosexual relationship between Carlin and another inmate, which was dropped from the film. Minton later said that this was a pity as it would have expanded Carlin's character and made him vulnerable in an area where he could not afford to be vulnerable.

The television play version of the film also features less graphic rape and suicide scenes. An additional scene shows Davis trying to talk to Carlin about the incident. Carlin dismisses him when he is reluctant to talk in front of Carlin's 'missus' (partner). In the remake, the relationship between Carlin and his 'missus' does not feature. Instead, during the mess, Davis looks up at Carlin from the dining table as if about to confide in him, but Carlin unwittingly chooses that moment to get up and leave.

Also in the television play, it is made clear at the end of the film that Banks is in hospital – resulting from the beating administered by Carlin when ousting him as the "daddy"; in the theatrical version he is present at the end moment of silence.

Release
The film had its UK premiere at the Prince Charles Cinema in London. It opened on 20 September 1979  at the Prince Charles Cinema and finished fifth at the London box office with a gross of £18,074 in its first week.

2017 re-release 
In 2017, Kino Lorber re-released the film in selected theatres for a limited time. In the United States, the film grossed $5,405.

Response 
In a High Court case against Channel 4 for showing the film, British morality campaigner Mary Whitehouse initially won her private prosecution, but the decision was later reversed on appeal. The Independent Broadcasting Authority had approved on its transmission. However, the film was received well by critics, and today enjoys a reputation of a classic cult movie. Philip Thomas of Empire said of the film, "Scum'''s brutality makes it a genuinely harrowing film. The bleak, snow-dusted locations, the featureless interiors of the institution, the perfect casting and magnificent acting of the indifferent and brutal staff make borstal appear to be what can only be described as a living hell." On review aggregator Rotten Tomatoes it has an approval rating of 89% based on reviews from 9 critics.

 Legacy 
In 2010, a Canadian film heavily based on Scum, titled Dog Pound, was released.

Home media
The film was first released on VHS video in the UK in 1983, where it was immediately caught up in the UK Video nasty controversy of the early 1980s.

It was later released on DVD in the UK by Odyssey and Prism Leisure. It was the digitally remastered uncut version but in fullscreen, with only a trailer and an interview as bonus features. In the US an Alan Clarke boxset was issued that included several films, among them both the BBC original and cinema version of the film plus audio commentaries. Prism Leisure released a limited edition 2 disc set in the UK on 13 June 2005. Disc One featured the BBC version with an audio commentary and two interviews. Disc Two instead featured the theatrical remake with an audio commentary, several interviews and featurettes and two trailers. It was digitally remastered from a widescreen print. This special edition DVD was sold in amaray slipcase packaging and also in a limited edition tin case. A Region 0 DVD boxset featuring both the theatrical version and the 1977 BBC-banned television version on separate discs followed in the US, released by Blue Underground. In 2015, Australian company Shock Entertainment released Scum'' on DVD and Blu-ray as part of their Cinema Cult line.

See also 
 Scum (television play)

References

External links 
 
 Scum at the British Film Institute

1979 films
1979 crime drama films
1970s prison drama films
1970s teen films
British prison drama films
British films based on plays
British teen drama films
Films directed by Alan Clarke
Films shot in Hertfordshire
1979 directorial debut films
1970s English-language films
1970s British films